Schachen LU railway station is a railway station in the municipality of Werthenstein, in the Swiss canton of Lucerne. It is an intermediate stop on the standard gauge Bern–Lucerne line of Swiss Federal Railways.

Services 
The following services stop at Schachen LU:

References

External links 
 
 

Railway stations in the canton of Lucerne
Swiss Federal Railways stations